Rufus the Hawk is a Harris's Hawk used by the All England Lawn Tennis and Croquet Club to keep pigeons away from their venue. Described as an "important member of the Wimbledon family", Rufus has been scaring away the birds for fifteen years, taking over from the previous hawk, Hamish.

The All England Club employ Rufus to patrol their 42-acre grounds throughout the year, with daily visits during the two weeks of The Championships and the 2012 Summer Olympics. Pigeons are particularly attracted to the roof of the centre court. He has also been employed to scare pigeons away from Westminster Abbey, various hospitals, airfields, and landfill sites.

On 28 June 2012, Rufus was stolen from the back of his owner's car while it was parked on a private drive. The theft caused a "global outcry" with significant coverage in the media leading to Rufus being named "the world's most notable bird" and "one of Britain's best-known birds". He was found three days later on Wimbledon Common and handed into the RSPCA. The bird was healthy with the only injury being a slightly sore leg. Rufus usually wears a radio transmitter by which he could have been tracked, but it is removed from him at night. In June 2013, it was reported that Rufus was scared by people in hoods and that he had been chased off by crows.

Rufus has also been featured by Stella Artois in their advertising series 'Here's To Perfection'.

Rufus has accounts on Twitter and Facebook and his own Wimbledon security photocard pass with the job title of "Bird Scarer".

See also
 List of individual birds

References

Individual birds of prey
Wimbledon Championships
Working birds
Tennis culture
Individual animals in England
Animal theft